Armando Ochoa may refer to:

Persons
Armando Xavier Ochoa - Roman Catholic Bishop
Armando Ochoa - known as El Graduado, fictional character and comic book supervillain